Nedlands is an affluent western suburb of Perth, the capital city of Western Australia. It is a part of the local government areas of the City of Nedlands and the City of Perth.

Features 
Nedlands is a mixed-character suburb. It contains:

 Low-cost housing for students at the neighbouring University of Western Australia
 Wealthy homes and a golf course (Nedlands Golf Club) in the southern half of the suburb
 A commercial area (located next to the Captain Stirling Hotel), restaurants and a small cinema (Windsor Cinema) along both sides of Stirling Highway
 The Lions Eye Institute, a major centre of research into eye disease, Sir Charles Gairdner Hospital, one of Perth's major public hospitals, and Hollywood Private Hospital (the former Repatriation General Hospital) and its neighbouring aged care facilities

The hospital and Stirling Highway are well served by the CircleRoute and other bus routes. Nedlands also contains some grocery shops and a library. It also contains the Perth Children's Hospital, adjoining the Sir Charles Gairdner Hospital, as part of the Queen Elizabeth II Medical Centre complex.

Parks 
The Peace Memorial Rose Garden on Stirling Highway commemorates lives lost in war. It was developed by the Rose Society and the Nedlands Road Board in the 1950s.  It was dedicated in 1951.

Transport
Nedlands is served by the CircleRoute and other services along Stirling Highway, Hampden Road, Broadway and Princess Road. All services are operated by Swan Transit.

Politics
Nedlands is part of the federal division of Curtin. The federal seat is held by the conservative Liberal Party. It is regarded as a safe seat as it has been continually retained by the Liberal Party with the exception of former Liberal member Allan Rocher as an Independent politician between 1996 and 1998. For the parliament of Western Australia, the state electoral district of Nedlands is held by Labor member Katrina Stratton.

Its easternmost booth near the university is marginal at both levels of government, and all parts of the suburb exhibit a strong Green vote (and historically environmental concerns have also resulted in a strong primary vote for Liberals for Forests).

Climate
Due to its elevation, Nedlands is slightly cooler and wetter than the Perth central business district.

Notable people
 David Indermaur, clinical psychologist

References

Further reading
 Williams, A. E. (1984) Nedlands : from campsite to city Nedlands, W.A : City of Nedlands.

External links

 City of Nedlands official website

 
Suburbs of Perth, Western Australia